Flight 850 may refer to

Varig Flight 850, crashed on 16 August 1957
Vietnam Airlines Flight 850, hijacked on 4 September 1992
Swiss International Air Lines Flight 850, crashed on 10 July 2002

0850